Research is systematic work to create new knowledge or devise new applications of knowledge.

Research may also refer to:

Places
 Research, Victoria, a suburb of Melbourne, Victoria, Australia
 Research Range, a mountain range at the northern end of the Ural Mountains

Ships
 Research (1861 ship), a ship launched at Yarmouth, Nova Scotia
 HCS Research (1823), a vessel that the British East India Company employed for exploration

Other uses
 Research (finance), a type of financial analysis on companies for investment purposes
 Research (horse) (foaled 1985), an Australian Thoroughbred racehorse
 "Research" (song), by Big Sean (2015)
 RE/Search, an American magazine and book publisher
 The Research, a 2000s English indie pop band

See also

Types of research
 Animal testing
 Applied research
 Basic research
 Human subject research
 Market research
 Medical research
 Psychological research
 Research and development
 Scientific research, investigation of phenomena or acquisition of knowledge using scientific methods
 Translational research
Other
 Epistemology
 Hermeneutics
 
 
 Search (disambiguation)